Waves is an unincorporated community and census-designated place (CDP) in Dare County, North Carolina, United States. It is on Hatteras Island, part of North Carolina's Outer Banks. As of the 2010 census it had a population of 134. Waves, along with Rodanthe and Salvo, are part of the settlement of Chicamacomico.

The residents of Waves are governed by the Dare County Board of Commissioners. Waves is part of District 4, along with Avon, Buxton, Frisco, Hatteras, Rodanthe and Salvo.

Demographics

2020 census

As of the 2020 United States census, there were 172 people, 24 households, and 13 families residing in the CDP.

History
The community was so named on account of waves at the beach.

The Rasmus Midgett House was listed on the National Register of Historic Places in 2009.

Boundaries
The northern border of Waves is generally considered to be the ditch that runs under Highway 12 just south of Resort Rodanthe Drive. The southern border, separating Waves and Salvo, is more ambiguous. Long-time residents indicate various "official lines" separating the two. Formerly Rodanthe, Waves and Salvo were each served by their own post office. Today a single post office, located in Waves, serves the entire community and the former lines that separated the communities have become blurred.

Economy
The Waves area is dominated by campgrounds both large and small as well as numerous rental houses.

Climate

According to the Trewartha climate classification system, Waves, North Carolina has a humid subtropical climate with hot and humid summers, cool winters and year-around precipitation (Cfak). Cfak climates are characterized by all months having an average mean temperature > 32.0 °F (> 0.0 °C), at least eight months with an average mean temperature ≥ 50.0 °F (≥ 10.0 °C), at least one month with an average mean temperature ≥ 71.6 °F (≥ 22.0 °C) and no significant precipitation difference between seasons. During the summer months in Waves, a cooling afternoon sea breeze is present on most days, but episodes of extreme heat and humidity can occur with heat index values ≥ 100 °F (≥ 38 °C). Waves is prone to hurricane strikes, particularly during the Atlantic hurricane season which extends from June 1 through November 30, sharply peaking from late August through September. During the winter months, episodes of cold and wind can occur with wind chill values < 10 °F (< -12 °C). The plant hardiness zone in Waves is 8b with an average annual extreme minimum air temperature of 17.2 °F (-8.2 °C). The average seasonal (Dec-Mar) snowfall total is < 2 inches (< 5 cm), and the average annual peak in nor'easter activity is in February.

Ecology

According to the A. W. Kuchler U.S. potential natural vegetation types, Waves, North Carolina would have a dominant vegetation type of Live oak/Sea Oats Uniola paniculata (90) with a dominant vegetation form of Coastal Prairie (20).

Education
Residents are zoned to Dare County Schools. Zoned schools are Cape Hatteras Elementary School and Cape Hatteras Secondary School.

References

Census-designated places in Dare County, North Carolina
Census-designated places in North Carolina
Beaches of North Carolina
Hatteras Island
Populated places established in 1939
1939 establishments in North Carolina
Beaches of Dare County, North Carolina
Populated coastal places in North Carolina